Manirampur Upazila is an upazila of Jashore District in the Division of Khulna, Bangladesh. It is bounded by Jashore Sadar Upazila on the north, Kalaroa and Jhikargachha upazilas on the west, Abhaynagar Upazila on the east, and Dumuria and Keshabpur upazilas on the south.

History

Short history 
Manirampur upazila stands on the bank of Harihar river.  There is a hearsay that Manirampur was named after the name of Muniram Roy who was the lawyer of King Seetaram Roy. Certain woman from Chanchra basilica (King palace) dug a large pond here which still stands as the witness of time. It was dug on the first decade of nineteenth century. The kings constructed a road of nine kilometres from Manirampur to Rajgonj at the Trimohani connecting road. Manirampur is known from 1785. The first elected chairman of Manirampur was Md Lutfar Rahman and the first nirbahi officer (TNO/UNO) was Md S. M. Mizanur Rahman.

During 1971
Shaheed Asaduzzaman Asad, younger brother of Poet and Professor of Dhaka University Muhammad Moniruzzaman from Chinatola village was killed 23 October during the 1971. He was buried in Chinatola, near Chinatola bridge on the bank of Harihar river.  Not only Asad, but also Sirajul Islam Shanti, Mashikur Rahman Tojo, Ahsan Uddin Khan Manik, Fazlur Rahman Fazlu were killed at the same time, same Place and they all are buried in a grave together.  They were bosom friend and leaders of political party. They were arrested together, killed together and buried together. 
Shaheed Akram, Khanpur, Manirampur was killed at
Juranpur, Manirampur.

1971 Liberation War
Manirampur thana was controlled by Sector 8 of the Bangladesh Armed Forces during the 1971 Bangladesh Liberation War. The sector's headquarters was at Benapole and it was commanded by Major Abu Osman Chowdhury (April 10 – July 17, 1971) then Major MA Manzur (August 14, 1971 – February 14, 1972) and First Shaheed in Manirampur GM Moslem Uddin.

Memorials: 
 Shaheed Akram Road, Manirampur,
 Manirampur Kendriyo Shaheed Minar.

Geography

Important low-lying areas include the Jhealdaha, Kedaria, Monaharpur and Moshihati beels. The main rivers in Manirampur are the Harihar and Vodra rivers.

Demographics
According to the 2011 Bangladesh census, Manirampur had a population of 417,421. Males constituted 49.55% of the population and females 50.45%. Muslims formed 82.17% of the population, Hindus 17.78%, Christians 0.03% and others 0.02%. Manirampur had a literacy rate of 53.66% for the population 7 years and above.

As the census of 1991, the total population of Manirampur was 326,093. Males constitute 51% of the population and females 49%. The density of population was 733/km2. The total people of eighteen years or older (18 or 18+) was 168,903 and the total number of households was 59,615. Manirampur had an average literacy rate of 29.1% (for people seven years or older), compared with the national average of 32.4%.

Only Town Population:

Only the Manirampur town had a population of 18874 as the census of 1991 where males are 52.36% and females are 47.64% of the town people. The density of town population was 1644/km2 and the literacy rate of town people was 43.3%.

Economy

Main crops:

The main crops of Manirampur Upazila are paddy, wheat, jute, potato, mustard etc. Extinct or nearly extinct crops includes linseed, indigo, kaun, arhar etc.

Main fruits:

Mango, jackfruit, papaya, banana etc.

Main Exports:

Date molasses, sugarcane molasses, jute, banana, paddy etc.

Fisheries:

A lot of people are now cultivating fish in 'Fish Fencing' or (in Bengali: 'Macher Gher'). It's a sort of fish farm in the low-lying areas of Manirampur and nearby the harihar river bank.

Manufactures:

Rice mill, Flour mill, Ice factory etc.

Cottage Industries:

Weaving, goldsmith, blacksmith, potteries, wood work, tailoring and welding.

Industries:

Though not an industrial area, it has an industry: Uttara Food Industry which produces animal foods.

Village fairs

Most famous Village Fairs of Manirampur Upazila are Mohonta Tala Mela Raghunarhpur (Balai Gushai Bari) near Garibpur Graveyard (Mahasmashan) and Khadapara Baidyanath Dham Mela held on the Month of ASHAR (June/July). It was more than Three Hundred Years old Mela.

Administration
Manirampur thana was turned into an upazila in 1983. Manirampur Municipality was formed on 10 November 1997.

Manirampur Upazila is divided into Manirampur Municipality and 17 union parishads: Bhojgati, Chaluahati, Dhakuria, Durbadanga, Haridaskati, Hariharnagar, Jhanpa, Kashimnagar, Khanpur, Khedapara, Kultia, Manirampur, Manoharpur, Maswimnagar, Nehalpur, Rohita, and Shyamkur. The union parishads are subdivided into 246 mauzas and 235 villages.

Political history

The upazila's members of parliament (MP) were:

 Pijush Kanti Bhattacharya (AL), beginning in 1973, who is the current Presidium Member of central Awami League.
 Afsar Siddiqui (BNP), beginning in 1979
 Mufti Wakkas (JP), beginning in 1986
 Khan Tipu Sultan (AL), beginning in 1991
 Again in 1996 (AL)
Mufti Wakkas (Jamat-e-Ulamai Islam), beginning in 2001
Khan Tipu Sultan (AL), beginning in 2008
 Swapon Kumar Bhattyacharya (Ind) beginning in 2014
Again in 2019 (AL)

The upazila has produced one Minister, Sarat Chandra Majumdar (1955–58) on the ticket of Pakistan National congress, and one State Minister of Religious Affairs, Mufti Wakkas, who held office under Hussain Muhammad Ershad.

Presently, Manirampur (Jessore-05) Honorable Parliamentary Member of the parliamentary constituency, Honorable State Minister of the Local Government, Rural Development and Co-operatives of the Government of the People's Republic of Bangladesh Swapan Bhattacharya, MP is performing the duties.

Infrastructure

Roads:

Manirampur Upazila has 44 km pucca, 32 km semi pucca and 786 km mud road.

Traditional transports:

PALANQUIN and Bullock cart.

Available transports:

Bus, Mini-bus, Micro-bus, Car (rent), Easy-bike, Rickshaw- van, Motor-bike (rent), Minidoor, Tempoo, Tekar, Alam- sadhu, Nasiman, Kariman etc. The means of transport are either extinct or nearly extinct.

Hospitals and clinics

The upazila has one 100-bed upazila health complex and two union health centers, one at Nehalpur and the other at Rajgong and several community clinics. Government has also established 10 community health clinics (CHC) at the village level. One of them is situated in Parala village. There are several private small hospitals and clinics too.

Arts and culture

Manirampur Upazila's cultural organizations include but isn't limited to– local libraries, poetry & literature clubs, music-drama-fine-arts clubs and academia, cultural activities centre.
Notable among them are ''Manirampur Public Library, Udichi, Manirampur Shilpi Gosthi and Mosiahati Theatre.

Voluntary organizations 

 Satyasandha – Social, Cultural & Voluntary Organization 
 Oved Blood Donation Organization
 Prottoy – Blood Donation, Cultural & Voluntary Organisation
 Nirsarto Movement ( নিঃস্বার্থ মুভমেন্ট) Social, Cultural and Voluntary Organisation..
 Tuniaghara Humanitarian Association টুনিয়াঘরা মানবকল্যাণ সংঘ (An independent human service organization)- Facebook- https://web.facebook.com/reza.humanwalfare.com.bd

Points of interest

 The most notable place to see in Manirampur is Vabodah Sluis Gate and Jhapa (Rajgong) Baor.  Rampur village is famous because it looks almost like an island. It is surrounded by Jhapa Baor  and Khajura Baor. The famous Kapatakkha River also flows beside this area. Khedapara Baor, near the Khedapara bazar.

Archaeological sights
A terracotta plaque bearing the image of Mallinath, a female tirthankar (saint) of the Jain religion, was found at the Mound of Dam Dam Peer in Manirampur Upazila.  It is believed to be the most ancient relic discovered from this part of the world. The Department at Khulna said that the plaque is at least 1800 years old. It is currently kept at the Khulna Museum.

Besides, "Neelkuthi" at village Joypur & "Kachari Ghar" are important Archaeological sites in Manirampur.

Education
There are several educational institutions:

High schools
Rajganj Secondary School, founded in 1916, Kultia Girls High School (1924), Manirampur Government High School (1932), Dhakuria Protapkati Secondary School (1939), and Manirampur Government Girls' High School (1965) are notable secondary schools.

Colleges
Manirampur Government College, Manirampur Girls College, Mashihati Degree College, Rajgonj Degree College, Khanpur College, Dhakuria College and Kuadha College are notable ones.

Madrasah

There are some famous madrasahs in Manirampur upazila. Noted ones are – Ittaya Dakhil Madrasa, Lauri-Ramnagar Kamil madrasa, Machna Modinatul-ulum Madrasa and Manirampur Alia Senior Madrasa.

University

 Musical university: World Village Cultural International College (proposed)

Notable people
Muhammad Wakkas, former Minister of Religious Affairs and Member of Parliament

See also 

 Upazilas of Bangladesh
 Jessore District
 Khulna Division

References 

Upazilas of Jessore District
Jashore District
Khulna Division